Looping Star is the name of several roller coasters:
Looping Star (Codona's Amusement Park)
Looping Star (Nagashima Spa Land)